"11 PM" is a Spanish-language song by Colombian singer Maluma, released as a single from his fourth studio album, 11:11. The song was released as the album's second single on 17 May 2019. The song peaked at number 11 on the Billboard Hot Latin Songs chart.

Music video
The music video for the song was released on the same day as the song. It was directed by Nuno Gomes and has amassed over 195 million views. Maluma plays a regular guy who's seeing a rich girl. She has a boyfriend who mistreats her but her parents want her to date him because he has money. Maluma insists on spending time with her. The music video portrays how the rich girl is trying to be something she's not, in order to impress her boyfriend. However, it doesn't work and she slowly starts to lose her emotions until her heart finally breaks, but along Maluma tries to help her to restore her passion.

Charts

Weekly charts

Year-end charts

Certifications

See also
 List of Billboard Argentina Hot 100 top-ten singles in 2019
List of Billboard number-one Latin songs of 2019

References

2019 songs
2019 singles
Maluma songs
Sony Music Latin singles
Spanish-language songs
Songs written by Edgar Barrera
Songs written by Maluma (singer)
Song recordings produced by Edgar Barrera